İkizce is a village in the central district of Şırnak Province in Turkey. The village had a population of 783 in 2021.

The two hamlets of Çavuşdede and Yarımkaya are attached to İkizce.

References 

Kurdish settlements in Şırnak Province
Villages in Şırnak District